Caravans is a 1978 Iranian-American adventure drama film directed by James Fargo based on the 1963 novel by James A. Michener. Nancy Voyles Crawford wrote the screenplay. This film represents people of Afghanistan and their tradition in Qandahar, Badakhshan cities in that time and the Kochi people of Afghanistan. The film was shot in Afghanistan and Iran and starred Anthony Quinn, Jennifer O'Neill, and Michael Sarrazin.

Plot
The story is set in the fictional Middle Eastern country of Zadestan in 1948. Mark Miller is stationed at the American Embassy in the fictional city of Kashkhan and is assigned to investigate the disappearance of a young woman, Ellen Jasper, the daughter of a United States senator, who vanished after her marriage to Colonel Nazrullah several months previously. Nazrullah is desperate to find her and becomes defensive when Miller asks about her. By law, Ellen has given up her rights as a US citizen by becoming his wife. Miller traces her to a band of nomads led by Zulffiqar who are illegal gun-runners. She doesn't want to leave, being estranged from both her parents and her husband. Miller doesn't want to return without proof she's alive and well, which she refuses to give. Nazrullah lures the gun-runners into a trap. He separates Miller from the nomads and asks his wife to return to him but she refuses. Ellen at last gives Miller a note for her family. As the nomads leave, Nazrullah orders his troops to fire on them and Ellen is killed trying to rescue a child. A heartbroken Nazrullah carries away the body of his dead wife.

Cast
Anthony Quinn as Zulffiqar
Michael Sarrazin as Mark Miller
Christopher Lee as Sardar Khan
Jennifer O'Neill as Ellen Jasper
Behrouz Vossoughi as Colonel Nazrullah
Joseph Cotten as Crandall
Barry Sullivan as Richardson
Jeremy Kemp as Dr. Smythe
Duncan Quinn as Moheb
Behrouz Gramian as Peasant Boy (Behrooz Gueramian)
Mohammad-Ali Keshavarz as Shakkur
Parviz Gharib-Afshar as Nur Mohammad
Fahimeh Amouzandeh as Mira
Mohammad Kahnemoui as Maftoon (Mohammad Taghi Kahnemoui)
Khosrow Tabatabai as Dancing Boy

Production
In the MGM Lionpower featurette in 1967 it was advertised as one of many coming attractions in development at the time. MGM later dropped out of the film's distribution. The film later was distributed by Universal.

Changes from the source novel
The film was not well received by James Michener as it strayed wildly from the plot of his book, even eradicating its main character, a Nazi war criminal on the run who falls in love with the female lead character. This omission and other story changes caused Michener to take legal action.

Music
Mike Batt wrote the score, which has been the most successful element of the film, the album remaining a bestseller for many years after the film's release. The main instrumental theme "Theme From Caravans" has been widely used in media, for example by East German ice-skating star Katarina Witt in her World Championship-winning routine. The vocal song "Caravan Song" was written by Mike Batt and sung by the British singer Barbara Dickson. It peaked at No. 41 in UK charts and was included on her album All for a Song.

Reception
Harold C. Schonberg of The New York Times panned the film as a "fake epic," adding. "It has a fabricated plot, based on the James Michener novel, it has bad acting, it has unbelievably inane dialogue, and it has every cliché in the books, including an ending with the caravan silhouetted against the sunset. Even so reliable an actor as Anthony Quinn looks idiotic; he displays his macho by grunts and muttering, and occasionally there is a peculiar look on his face that suggests what he really thinks of all this nonsense." Variety wrote, "The main trouble with 'Caravans' isn't the Iranians, it's Hollywood. Almost every fake moment in the film, and there are lots of them, has the touch of Hollywood laid on with a heavy coating. Take away the Americans, of course, and you wouldn't have such a slick film, but you might have a more honest one." Roger Ebert of the Chicago Sun-Times gave the film 2 stars out of 4 and wrote that it was "slow and obvious, and at the end rather pointless," but "if you're facing a slow Sunday afternoon with a lot of time before the roast is done, 'Caravans' could, in its own way, be fun." Gene Siskel of the Chicago Tribune gave the film 1 star out of 4 and called it "a thoroughly laughable desert adventure" with the relationship between Quinn and O'Neill getting "short shrift" and the movie lacking "an action scene of any merit. Only at the very end is there a battle of sorts. But director James Fargo ... shoots these scenes in boring medium shots. They are as exciting as if they had been shot with models in a sandbox." Kevin Thomas of the Los Angeles Times called the film "a stirring romantic epic on a grand scale marred by patches of truly terrible dialogue. As a result, despite all that this Universal release has going for it in the way of visual splendor and high adventure, it is likely to be entertaining only for the least discriminating (or most indulgent)." Gary Arnold of The Washington Post wrote, "'Caravans' will be lucky if it's remembered as an expensive flop ... Ironically, the film's emptiness is magnified by the contrast between its drab, flimsy plot and vast, majestic landscapes. 'Caravans' is too inert to be salvaged by the photogenic advantages of impressive scenery." Tim Pulleine of The Monthly Film Bulletin wrote that "Ellen's twofold defection remains resolutely undramatised and the gun-running sub-plot is mainly demoted to a few cryptic reference to off-screen action. The movie thus becomes a tiresome exercise in anti-climax."

References

External links

English-language Iranian films
1978 films
Films set in the Middle East
Films set in Asia
Films set in 1948
Universal Pictures films
American adventure drama films
1970s Persian-language films
Films shot in Iran
Iranian multilingual films
American multilingual films
1970s adventure drama films
1978 multilingual films
1978 drama films
Iranian adventure films
Iranian drama films
Films directed by James Fargo
1970s English-language films
1970s American films